Deyanira Angulo Chiñas (born 3 March 1991) is a Mexican badminton player. Angulo was the only Mexican badminton player to compete at the 2008 Summer Olympics in Beijing. She lost the first preliminary round match of the women's singles to Egypt's Hadia Hosny, with a score of 18–21, 21–7, and 14–21.

Achievements

BWF International Challenge/Series 
Women's singles

Women's doubles

Mixed doubles

  BWF International Challenge tournament
  BWF International Series tournament
  BWF Future Series tournament

References

External links 
 NBC Olympics Profile

1991 births
Living people
People from Naucalpan
Sportspeople from the State of Mexico
Mexican female badminton players
Badminton players at the 2008 Summer Olympics
Olympic badminton players of Mexico
21st-century Mexican women